The fourth competition weekend of the 2009–10 ISU Speed Skating World Cup was held in the Olympic Oval, Calgary, Canada, from Friday, 4 December, until Sunday, 6 December 2009.

In the women's team pursuit event, Canada's team, comprised by Kristina Groves, Christine Nesbitt and Brittany Schussler, set a new world record of 2:55.79.

Schedule of events
The schedule of the event is below.

Medal summary

Men's events

Women's events

References

Results

4
Isu World Cup, 2009-10, 4
Sport in Calgary